The 2019 Yobe State House of Assembly election was held on March 9, 2019, to elect members of the Yobe State House of Assembly in Nigeria. All the 24 seats were up for election in the Yobe State House of Assembly.

Ahmed Lawan Mirwa from APC representing Nguru II constituency was elected Speaker, while Auwal Isa Bello Danchuwa from APC representing Mamudo constituency was elected Deputy Speaker.

Results 
The result of the election is listed below.

 Ahmed Lawan Mirwa from APC won Nguru II constituency
 Auwal Isa Bello Danchuwa from APC won Mamudo constituency
 Mohammad Lamido from APC won Tarmuwa constituency
 Gafu Mai Zabu from APC won Bade West constituency
 Mohammad Bazani from APC won Damaturu I constituency
 Ishaku Sani Audu from APC won Goya/Ngegi constituency
 Chiroma A. Buba from APC won Fune I constituency
 Mohammad Ali from APC won Gaidam South constituency
 Bunu Zanna from APC won Gulani constituency
 18 Adamu Dafa Dogo from APC won Karasuwa constituency
 Abdullahi Adamu Bazuwa from APC won Potiskum constituency
 Hassan Mohammad from APC won Yusufari constituency
 Yakubu Suleiman from APC won Fika/Ngalda constituency
 Mala Lawan Jawa from APC won Busari constituency
 Buba Ibrahim from APC won Damaturu II constituency
 Digima Gana from APC won Damagun constituency
 Bukar Mustapha from APC won Gaidam North constituency
 Lawan Sani Inuwa from PDP won Nguru I constituency
 Bulama Bukar from APC won Gujba constituency
 Ya'u Usman Dachia from APC won Jakusko constituency
 Saminu Musa Lawan from APC won Nangere constituency
 Ahmed Musa Dumbol from APC won Yunusari constituency
 Ahmed Musa Dumbol from APC won Yunusari constituency
 Mohammad Kabir Mai Malo from APC won Bade East constituency

References 

Yobe
2019 Yobe State elections